Mode of transport is a term used to distinguish between different ways of transportation or transporting people or goods. The different modes of transport are air, water, and land transport, which includes rails or railways, road and off-road transport. Other modes also exist, including pipelines, cable transport, and space transport. Human-powered transport and animal-powered transport are sometimes regarded as their own mode, but never fall into the other categories. In general, transportation is used for moving of people, animals, and other goods from one place to another. Means of transport, on the other hand, refers to the transport facilities used to carry people or cargo according to the chosen mode (animal, vehicle, car, airplane, ship, truck, train and so on and so forth). Each mode of transport has a fundamentally different technological solution, and some require a separate environment. Each mode has its own infrastructure, vehicles, transport operators and operations.

Animal-powered

Animal-powered transport is the use of working animals for the transport of people and/or goods. Humans may use some of the animals directly, use them as pack animals for carrying goods, or harness them, alone or in teams, to pull watercraft, sleds, or wheeled vehicles.

Air

A fixed-wing aircraft, typically airplane, is a heavier-than-air flying vehicle, in which the special geometry of the wings generates lift and then lifts the whole vehicle. Fixed-wing aircraft range from small trainers and recreational aircraft to large airliners and military cargo aircraft. For short distances or in places without runways, helicopters can be operable. (Other types of aircraft, like autogyros and airships, are not a significant portion of air transport.)

This celerity comes with higher cost and energy use, and aviation's impacts to the environment and particularly the global climate require consideration when comparing modes of transportation. The Intergovernmental Panel on Climate Change (IPCC) estimates a commercial jet's flight to have some 2-4 times the effect on the climate than if the same CO2 emissions were made at ground level, because of different atmospheric chemistry and radiative forcing effects at the higher altitude. U.S. airlines alone burned about 16.2 billion gallons of fuel during the twelve months between October 2013 and September 2014. WHO estimates that globally as many as 500,000 people at a time are on planes. The global trend has been for increasing numbers of people to travel by air, and individually to do so with increasing frequency and over longer distances, a dilemma that has the attention of climate scientists and other researchers, the press, and the World Wide Web. The issue of impacts from frequent travel, particularly by air because of the long distances that are easily covered in one or a few days, is called hypermobility  and has been a topic of research and governmental concern for many years.

Human powered

Human powered transport, a form of sustainable transportation, is the transport of people and/or goods using human muscle-power, in the form of walking, running and swimming. Modern technology has allowed machines to enhance human power. Human-powered transport remains popular for reasons of cost-saving, leisure, physical exercise, and environmentalism; it is sometimes the only type available, especially in underdeveloped or inaccessible regions.

Although humans are able to walk without infrastructure, the transport can be enhanced through the use of roads, especially when using the human power with vehicles, such as bicycles and inline skates. Human-powered vehicles have also been developed for difficult environments, such as snow and water, by watercraft rowing and skiing; even the air can be entered with human-powered aircraft.

Land

Land transport covers all land-based transportation systems that provide for the movement of people, goods and services. Land transport plays a vital role in linking communities to each other. Land transport is a key factor in urban planning. It consists of 2 kinds, rail and road.

Rail

Rail transport is a means of conveyance of passengers and goods by way of wheeled vehicles running on rail track, known as a railway or railroad. The rails are anchored perpendicular to railroad train consists of one or more connected vehicles that run on the rails. Propulsion is commonly provided by a locomotive, that hauls a series of unpowered cars, that can carry passengers or freight. The locomotive can be powered by steam, diesel or by electricity supplied by trackside systems. Alternatively, some or all the cars can be powered, known as a multiple unit. Also, a train can be powered by horses, cables, gravity, pneumatics and gas turbines. Railed vehicles move with much less friction than rubber tires on paved roads, making trains more energy efficient, though not as efficient as ships.

Regional and commuter trains feed cities from suburbs and surrounding areas, while intra-urban transport is performed by high-capacity tramways and rapid transits, often making up the backbone of a city's public transport. Freight trains traditionally used box cars, requiring manual loading and unloading of the cargo. Since the 1960s, container trains have become the dominant solution for general freight, while large quantities of bulk are transported by dedicated trains.

Road

A road is an identifiable route of travel, usually surfaced with gravel, asphalt or concrete, and supporting land passage by foot or by a number of vehicles.

The most common road vehicle in the developed world is the automobile, a wheeled passenger vehicle that carries its own motor. As of 2002, there were 591 million automobiles worldwide. Other users of roads include motorcars, motorcycles, buses, trucks, bicycles and pedestrians, and special provisions are sometimes made for each of these. For example, the use of bus lanes give priority for public transport, and cycle lanes provide special areas of road for bicycles to use.

Motorcars offer high flexibility, but are deemed with high energy and area use, and the main source of noise and air pollution in cities;  buses allow for more efficient travel at the cost of reduced flexibility. Road transport by truck is often the initial and final stage of freight transport.

Water

Water  transport is the process of transport that a watercraft, such as a bart, ship or sailboat, makes over a body of water, such as a sea, ocean, lake, canal, or river. If a boat or other vessel can successfully pass through a waterway it is known as a navigable waterway. The need for buoyancy unites watercraft, and makes the hull a dominant aspect of its construction, maintenance and appearance. When a boat is floating on the water the hull of the boat is pushing aside water where the hull now is, this is known as displacement.

In the 1800s, the first steamboats were developed, using a steam engine to drive a paddle wheel or propeller to move the ship. The steam was produced using wood or coal. Now, most ships have an engine using a slightly refined type of petroleum called bunker fuel. Some ships, such as submarines, use nuclear power to produce the steam. Recreational or educational craft still use wind power, while some smaller craft use internal combustion engines to drive one or more propellers, or in the case of jet boats, an inboard water jet. In shallow draft areas, hovercraft are propelled by large pusher-prop fans.

Although slow, modern sea transport is a highly effective method of transporting large quantities of non-perishable goods. Commercial vessels, nearly 35,000 in number, carried 7.4 billion tons of cargo in 2007. Transport by water is significantly less costly than air transport for transcontinental shipping; short sea shipping and ferries remain viable in coastal areas.

Other modes

Micromobility is the collective name for small electric powered vehicles.

Pipeline transport sends goods through a pipe, most commonly liquid and gases are sent, but pneumatic tubes can also send solid capsules using compressed air. For example liquids/gases, any chemically stable liquid or gas can be sent through a pipeline. Short-distance systems exist for sewage, slurry water and beer, while long-distance networks are used for petroleum and natural gas.

Cable transport is a broad mode where vehicles are pulled by cables instead of an internal power source. It is most commonly used at steep gradient. Typical solutions include aerial tramway, elevators, escalator and ski lifts; some of these are also categorized as conveyor transport.

Space transport is transport out of Earth's atmosphere into outer space by means of a spacecraft. While large amounts of research have gone into technology, it is rarely used except to put satellites into orbit, and conduct scientific experiments. However, people have landed on the moon, and probes have been sent to all the planets of the Solar System.

Unmanned aerial vehicle transport (drone transport) is being used for medicine transportation in least developed countries with inadequate infrastructure by an american based start-up Zipline. Amazon.com and other transportation companies are currently testing the use of unmanned aerial vehicles in parcel delivery. This method will allow short-range small-parcel delivery in a short time frame.

Components of a mode of transport
A transport mode is a combination of the following:

Transportation infrastructure: thoroughfares, networks, hubs (stations, bus terminals, airport terminals), etc.
Vehicles and containers: motor vehicles, automobiles, motorcycles, trucks, wagons, trains, ships, and aircraft
A stationary or mobile workforce
Propulsion system and power supply (traction)
Operations: driving, management, traffic signals, railway signalling, air traffic control, etc.

Comparison of the transport mode by distance travelled

Worldwide, the most widely used modes for passenger transport are the Automobile (16,000 bn passenger km), followed by Buses (7,000), Air (2,800), Railways (1,900), and Urban Rail (250).

The most widely used modes for freight transport are Sea (40,000 bn ton km), followed by Road (7,000), Railways (6,500), Oil pipelines (2,000) and Inland Navigation (1,500).

See also 
 Modal share
 Car ownership

References